Jonathan David Bennett  (born June 10, 1981) is an American actor and television host. He is known for his roles as Aaron Samuels in the 2004 comedy film Mean Girls, Bud McNulty in 2005's Cheaper by the Dozen 2, the title character in the 2009 direct-to-DVD comedy Van Wilder: Freshman Year, and his recurring role as Casey Gant in the mystery drama Veronica Mars. He was the host of the Food Network series Halloween Wars, and he previously hosted Cake Wars.

Early life
Bennett was born in Ohio, to David Bennett, a Toledo physician, and Ruthanne Bennett (née Mason). He has two half-brothers, Brian and Brent, and one half-sister, Lisa.

Bennett attended Eagle Point Elementary School in Rossford, Ohio, and graduated from Rossford High School in 1999. Bennett attended Otterbein University.

Career
After moving to New York, he was cast on the ABC soap opera All My Children as JR Chandler from 2001 to 2002. Since then, he has appeared in various television dramas, including Law & Order: Special Victims Unit, Smallville, and Veronica Mars.

Bennett co-starred in the 2004 comedy movie Mean Girls as Aaron Samuels, the love interest of star Lindsay Lohan's character. In 2005, he co-starred in the family comedy movie Cheaper by the Dozen 2 and the romantic comedy movie Lovewrecked. In 2007, Bennett appeared in the direct-to-video prequel TV series The Dukes of Hazzard: The Beginning, in which he played Bo Duke. In 2009, he starred as the title character in Van Wilder: Freshman Year, and appeared as Nick in the Hallmark original movie Elevator Girl.

On September 4, 2014, Bennett was announced as one of the celebrities competing on the 19th season of Dancing with the Stars. He was paired with professional dancer Allison Holker. Bennett and Holker were eliminated on Week 6 of the competition and finished in 9th place.

From 2015 to 2017, Bennett hosted the Food Network cooking competition show Cake Wars.

In 2016, Bennett played gay sports agent Lucas in two episodes of Hit the Floor.

In 2018, with celebrity chef Nikki Martin, he released a pop culture cookbook titled The Burn CookBook.

On January 13, 2019, it was announced that Bennett would be a houseguest on the second season of the reality competition show Celebrity Big Brother.

In 2022, Bennett starred in the first LGBTQ-led Hallmark Channel Christmas movie, The Holiday Sitter.

Personal life
Bennett is openly gay. Bennett's mother Ruthanne died November 30, 2012, at 67, followed by his father David on April 28, 2014, at 73. On November 30, 2020, representatives for Bennett confirmed he was engaged to Amazing Race contestant and current Celebrity Page host Jaymes Vaughan, who proposed on the set for The Christmas House with an original song. In 2021, Bennett and Vaughan became the first gay couple to appear on the cover of the magazine The Knot. In March 2022, the couple got married at the Unico Riviera Maya Hotel in Mexico.

Filmography

Film

Television

Music videos

References

External links
 
 

1981 births
Living people
20th-century American male actors
21st-century American male actors
American male film actors
American male soap opera actors
American male television actors
Male actors from Toledo, Ohio
Otterbein University alumni
American gay actors
LGBT people from Ohio
People from Rossford, Ohio